The 1899 William & Mary Orange and White football team was an American football team that represented the College of William & Mary as an independent during the 1899 college football season. Led by William H. Burke in his first and only season as head coach, the Orange and White compiled a record of 2–3.

Schedule

References

William and Mary
William & Mary Tribe football seasons
William